Arnold Perl (April 14, 1914 – December 11, 1971) was an American playwright, screenwriter, television producer and television writer.

Perl briefly attended Cornell University, but did not graduate. He had written for the television series The Big Story, Naked City, The Doctors and the Nurses, East Side/West Side and N.Y.P.D., which he created with David Susskind. Perl also co-wrote the screenplay for Cotton Comes to Harlem (1970), actor Ossie Davis' film directing debut. Perl also wrote the play Tevye and his Daughters.

Perl also wrote and directed the documentary film Malcolm X (1972). Perl died in 1971. He was nominated posthumously for the Academy Award for Best Documentary Feature for his work on the film in 1973. Perl's script for the film was later re-written by Spike Lee for his 1992 film on Malcolm X.

References

External links

1914 births
1971 deaths
American male screenwriters
American television producers
American television writers
Place of birth missing
20th-century American dramatists and playwrights
American male television writers
American male dramatists and playwrights
20th-century American businesspeople
Cornell University School of Industrial and Labor Relations alumni
20th-century American male writers
20th-century American screenwriters